Neil Donald Cole (born 25 May 1957) is an Australian playwright, researcher and former politician.

Early life
Cole was born in Millicent, South Australia, and spent his early years in Malaysia where his father was a military police officer in the Royal Australian Corps of Military Police stationed at RAAF Butterworth in Penang. When his father was reassigned to Point Cook, the family moved into the housing commission high-rise flats in North Melbourne where Cole attended Flemington High School, and Kyneton High School in 1974. In 1980, he graduated with a law degree from the University of Melbourne, and in the same year, founded the Flemington Community Legal Service where he worked as a community lawyer for seven years.

Political career
Cole first entered politics at a local level, serving on the Melbourne City Council for three years in the 1980s.

In 1988, Cole decided to run for the safe Labor seat of Melbourne in the Victorian Parliament. Preselection for Melbourne was considered "unwinnable", given that the candidacy for the seat was already earmarked for ALP state secretary Jenny Beacham. Aware that he was "supposed" to lose by nine votes, Cole worked the numbers and managed to win preselection, subsequently winning the seat at the 1988 state election. In 1992, he was promoted to Joan Kirner's shadow cabinet as Shadow Minister for Consumer Affairs and Shadow Attorney-General.

Early in his political career, Cole had suffered a number of mental breakdowns. In 1993, he was diagnosed with manic-depressive disorder. In 1995, Cole's condition became public knowledge as it was leaked to the media by his political enemies, and he publicly declared that he suffered from mental illness, stood down as Shadow Attorney-General, and was admitted to The Melbourne Clinic shortly afterwards. Following the revelation of his illness, Cole was re-elected as MLA for Melbourne in the 1996 election, a win he described as the "most gratifying thing" in his parliamentary career. His political career ended in 1999, when he lost preselection for Melbourne in the 1999 election to Bronwyn Pike, who was subsequently elected.

Writing career
Since leaving politics, Cole has written over twelve plays, most of them performed by La Mama Theatre. His first play, Alive at Williamstown Pier, won the Griffin Award for New Australian Playwriting in 1999. In 2001, he was awarded the Centenary Medal for service to Australian society and literature.

Cole's debut novel, Colonel Surry's Insanity, was published in 2010. The novel, about a fictional soldier (John Surry) who pleads not guilty to a charge of theft on the grounds of insanity, was based on interviews with twenty sufferers of manic depression, as well as his own perspective.

Academic career
Cole is an associate professor at the Monash University School of Medicine, and is also a member of the National Advisory Council on Mental Health established in 2008.

References

External links
Neil Cole, Playwright official website

1957 births
Living people
Australian dramatists and playwrights
Members of the Victorian Legislative Assembly
Recipients of the Centenary Medal
Melbourne Law School alumni
Academic staff of Monash University
People with bipolar disorder
Bipolar disorder researchers
Lawyers from Melbourne
Australian Labor Party members of the Parliament of Victoria
People from Millicent, South Australia
Writers from Melbourne
People from North Melbourne